Cabezuela del Valle is a municipality in the province of Cáceres, Extremadura, Spain. According to the 2005 census (INE), the municipality has a population of 2173.

References

Municipalities in the Province of Cáceres